Elections for Kettering Borough Council, which covers the Borough of Kettering, were held on 1 May 2003 and were won by the Conservatives, gaining overall control from Labour.

Summary results
The overall results, using average ward votes for the total number of votes cast, were as follows:

(Vote counts shown are ward averages)

Council Before 2003 Elections
Before the elections held on 1 May 2003, the composition of Kettering Borough Council was as follows:

Labour Majority of 1

Ward-by-Ward Results

All Saints Ward (2 seats)

(Vote count shown is ward average)

Avondale Ward (2 seats)

(Vote count shown is ward average)

Barton Ward (2 seats)

(Vote count shown is ward average)

Brambleside Ward (2 seats)

(Vote count shown is ward average)

Buccleuch Ward (1 seat)

(Vote count shown is ward average)

Loatland Ward (2 seats)

(Vote count shown is ward average)

St Giles Ward (2 seats)

(Vote count shown is ward average)

Latimer Ward (Burton Latimer) (2 seats)

(Vote count shown is ward average)

Millbrook Ward (Ise Lodge) (2 seats)

(Vote count shown is ward average)

Piper's Hill Ward (2 seats)

(Vote count shown is ward average)

Plessy Ward (Burton Latimer) (2 seats)

(Vote count shown is ward average)

Queen Eleanor Ward (1 seat)

(Vote count shown is ward average)

Slade Ward (2 seats)

(Vote count shown is ward average)

Spinney Ward (Ise Lodge) (2 seats)

(Vote count shown is ward average)

St. Andrew's Ward (3 seats)

(Vote count shown is ward average)

St. Mary's Ward (3 seats)

(Vote count shown is ward average)

St. Michael's Ward (2 seats)

(Vote count shown is ward average)

St. Peter's Ward (2 seats)

(Vote count shown is ward average)

Rothwell Tresham Ward (2 seats)

(Vote count shown is ward average)

Rothwell Trinity Ward (2 seats)

(Vote count shown is ward average)

Warkton Ward (2 seats)

(Vote count shown is ward average)

Welland Ward (1 seat)

(Vote count shown is ward average)

Wicksteed Ward (2 seats)

(Vote count shown is ward average)

Borough Council By-elections (since May 2003)

Latimer Ward (Burton Latimer) By-Election: 28 July 2005
 Cause: Death of Cllr. Ted Evans
 Holding Party: Conservative

Electorate: 2498

Wicksteed Ward By-Election: 6 October 2005
 Cause: Resignation of Cllr. Derek Darby
 Holding Party: Conservative

Electorate: 2638

St. Mary's Ward By-Election: 17 November 2005
 Cause: Resignation of Cllr. Gina Beale
 Holding Party: Labour

Electorate: 4011

See also
Kettering Borough Council
Kettering (UK Parliament constituency)

External links
Kettering Borough Council website

2003 English local elections
2003
2000s in Northamptonshire